Like Twenty Impossibles (Ka'inana Ashrun Mustaheel) is an independent short film written and directed by Annemarie Jacir in 2003.

It received attention when it became the first ever short film from the Arab world to be chosen as an Official Selection of the Cannes International Film Festival. As well as being the first Palestinian short film in Cannes, it also marked the first time a Palestinian female director walked the red carpet. The film went on to win numerous awards and was a National Finalist at the Academy Awards, breaking new ground for Arab cinema. It is a fiction film following a Palestinian film crew shot in Palestine.
Annemarie Jacir is considered part of the Arab New Wave Cinema.

Synopsis 

Occupied Palestine: A serene landscape now pockmarked by military checkpoints. When a Palestinian film crew averts a closed checkpoint by taking a remote side road, the political landscape unravels, and the passengers are slowly taken apart by the mundane brutality of military occupation. Both a visual poem and a narrative, like twenty impossibles wryly questions artistic responsibility and the politics of filmmaking, while speaking to the fragmentation of a people.

First Palestinian short film to be an Official Selection at Cannes Film Festival, a National Finalist of Academy Awards and winner of over 15 awards including Best Film at Chicago International Film Festival, IFP/New York, Institut du Monde Arabe, and Palm Springs International Film Festival.

Awards 

World Premiere, Cannes Film Festival, Official Selection, Cinefondation, 2003
Best Films of the Year list - Film Comment Magazine
National Finalist - Academy of Motion Picture Arts, Student Academy Awards
Best Short Screenplay - Nantucket Film Festival, 2003
Best Short Film - Palm Springs International Short Film Festival
Best Short Film (Emerging Narrative) - IFP/New York
Silver Plaque - Chicago International Film Festival
Best Short Film - Institute Du Monde Arabe Biannual
Best Screenwriting – Lenola Film Festival, Italy
Best Short Film Second Prize – Lenola Film Festival, Italy
Audience Choice Award - Polo Ralph Lauren Columbia University Festival
Special Jury Prize - Ramallah International Film Festival
Audience Choice Award – San Diego Women Film Festival 2006
Luis Trenker Award for Best Short Film – 4Film Festival, Borderlands, 2006
National Qualifier - Academy of Motion Picture Arts, Academy Awards
Locarno Film Festival, Official Selection
Edinburgh International Film Festival, Official Selection
Telluride Film Festival, Official Selection
New York Film Festival, Official Selection

Notes

External links 
 
 Philistine Films
  Festival de Cannes: like twenty impossibles
  MEC

Films shot in the State of Palestine
2003 short films
Israeli–Palestinian conflict films
2003 films